is a Tokyo-born composer and jazz musician, based in New York City.

Early life and career
Miho Hazama started to play electric keyboard at the age of three at Yamaha Music Foundation's School, and received attention when she proceeded to the final of Junior Electone Concours '96 at the age of ten.

In 2010, Hazama moved to New York City to study jazz composition in master's program of Manhattan School of Music (MSM). While attending, she studied under Jim McNeely, and received 2011 ASCAP Foundation Young Jazz Composer Awards. Hazama obtained her master's degree in May 2012 and recorded her first album Journey to Journey in July 2012.
Yōsuke Yamashita produced her professional debut event in January 2013, held at Tokyo Opera City Tower.

In May 2017, Hazama became a composer in residence of Siena Wind Orchestra.
She was the 2018-2019 composer of the year for the Orchestra Ensemble Kanazawa.

In June 2019, Hazama was appointed as chief conductor of Danish Radio Big Band.
She is also the Associate Artistic Director of The New York Jazzharmonic.

In August 2020, Hazama became a permanent guest conductor of The Metropole Orkest.

Awards and honors
2011: ASCAP Foundation Young Jazz Composer Awards
2013: Jazz Japan Award 2012: "Jazz Japan Album of the year / Rising star category" for Journey to Journey
2014: 24th (FY 2013) 
2015: BMI 16th Annual Charlie Parker Jazz Composition Prize for “Somnambulant"
2016: DownBeat magazine: “25 for the Future”

Discography

As band leader
 Journey to Journey with m_unit (Universal Music/Verve, 2012; Sunnyside, 2013)
 Time River with m_unit (Verve & Sunnyside, 2015)
 The Monk: Live at Bimhuis with Metropole Orkest Big Band (Verve & Sunnyside, 2018)
 Dancer in Nowhere with m_unit (Verve, 2018; Sunnyside, 2019)
 Marius Neset, Tributes with Danish Radio Big Band (ACT Music, 2020)
 Imaginary Visions featuring The Danish Radio Big Band (Edition, 2021)

Selective compositions and arrangements
 Yōsuke Yamashita, Yutaka Sado "Yōsuke Yamashita: Piano Concerto No.3 EXPLORER" orchestration in Explorer×Sudden Fiction (Avex Classics, 2008) - with Tokyo Philharmonic Orchestra
 Shirō Sagisu,  (Starchild, 2012) – soundtrack orchestration of Evangelion: 3.0 You Can (Not) Redo 
 Ryuichi Sakamoto, "0322 C# Minor", "Trace", "After All" arrangements in Playing The Orchestra 2013, (commmons, 2013)
 Junko Onishi, "The Intersection" composition in Tea Times (Sony/Taboo, 2016)
 Junko Onishi, "Willow Song (from Otello)" arrangement in Very Special (Sony/Taboo, 2017)
 Raul Midón, "Everyone Deserves A Second Chance" arrangement in If You Really Want (Artistry Music, 2018)
 Miki Imai, "" arrangement in Classic Ivory 35th Anniversary Orchestral Best (Universal Music Japan, 2020)
 Christian Sands, "Be Water II" arrangement in Be Water (Mack Avenue, 2020)

References

External links

 
 Miho Hazama at Sunnyside Records

1986 births
Living people
Japanese women composers
Japanese jazz musicians
Musicians from New York City
Musicians from Tokyo